Life in San Antonio is a reunion 2002 album by Budgie, recorded live on 2 August at the Sunken Garden Theater in San Antonio, Texas.

Track listing

Personnel
Budgie
Burke Shelley - bass guitar, vocals
Steve Williams- drums, percussion
Andy Hart - guitar, vocals

Trivia
The other bands that performed on this bill were:

S.A. Sanctuary
Oz Knozz
Judas Priest

References

2002 live albums
Budgie (band) live albums
RCA Records live albums